OpenBiome is a nonprofit organization in Somerville, Massachusetts, which operates a public stool bank and supports research on the human microbiome.

History 
OpenBiome distributes material to hospitals and clinics to support the treatment of C. difficile, the most common pathogen causing hospital-acquired infection in the U.S. OpenBiome provides frozen preparations of screened and filtered human stool for use in fecal microbiota transplantation (FMT) therapies. OpenBiome can provide clinicians with three different formulations: a high-concentration "FMP 30" formulation for delivery via the upper gastrointestinal tract, a lower-concentration "FMP 250" for delivery via the lower gastrointestinal tract, and, as of October 2015, a capsule formulation.  As of March 2017, OpenBiome had provided over 20,000 treatments to 50 states and 7 countries.

In 2015, OpenBiome announced the launch of PersonalBiome, a stool banking program through which individuals could store their stool for future use in fecal transplantation after microbial dysbiosis.

OpenBiome was founded in 2012 by Mark Smith, a microbiology student at MIT, and James Burgess, an MBA student at the MIT Sloan School of Management. It is the first public stool bank, and was founded to facilitate use of FMT. The logistical burdens associated with screening and processing fecal material have made it difficult for clinicians to offer FMT to patients with recurrent C. difficile infections.

References

External links 
 Official Website

Feces
Organizations established in 2012
Health charities in the United States
Charities based in Massachusetts
Medical and health organizations based in Massachusetts
2012 establishments in Massachusetts